Auguste Cornu (1888-1981) was a French Marxist philosopher and historian of Marxism.

Life
Auguste Cornu was born on 9 August 1888 in Beaune, France. He joined the French Section of the Workers' International in 1913, and later joined the French Communist Party. Cornu's 1934 doctoral thesis was the first academic thesis on Karl Marx. A member of the French resistance, he moved to East Berlin after World War II. From 1949 to 1956 he was Professor at the Humboldt University of Berlin.

Works
 Karl Marx: L’Homme et l'oeuvre: De l’Hégélianisme au matérialisme historique (1818–1845). Paris, 1934.
 Karl Marx und die Entwicklung des modernen Denkens. Berlin, 1950.
 Essai de critique marxiste. Paris [1951].
 Karl Marx: Die ökonomisch-philosophischen Manuskripte. Berlin, 1955.

References

1888 births
1981 deaths
French Marxists
French Marxist historians
20th-century French philosophers